Erwin House may refer to:

 Erwin House (Greenwood, Florida)
 Erwin House (Marshall County, Indiana)
 Erwin House (Allendale, South Carolina)